John Hungerford may refer to:

John Hungerford (by 1516 – 1582) of Stokke and Down Ampney, English MP for Great Bedwyn
John Hungerford (died 1635) of Down Ampney, English MP for Gloucestershire, 1597 and Cricklade, 1604 and 1611
John Hungerford (c. 1560 – 1636) of Cadnam, English MP for Wootton Bassett and Chippenham
John Hungerford (congressman) (1761–1833), politician and lawyer from Virginia.
John Hungerford (died 1729), lawyer and English MP for Scarborough 
John N. Hungerford (1825–1883), U.S. Representative from New York